The Coinage Act of 1864 was a United States federal law passed on April 22, 1864, which changed the composition of the one-cent coin and authorized the minting of the two-cent coin. The Director of the U.S. Mint developed the designs for these coins for final approval of the Secretary of the Treasury. As a result of this law, the phrase "In God We Trust" first appeared, on the 1864 two-cent coin. An Act of Congress, passed on March 3, 1865, allowed the Mint Director, with the Secretary's approval, to place the phrase on all gold and silver coins that "shall admit the inscription thereon." In 1956, "In God We Trust" replaced "E Pluribus Unum" as the national motto. All currency was printed and minted with the new motto.

See also

Coinage Act of 1792
Coinage Act of 1834
Coinage Act of 1849
Coinage Act of 1853
Coinage Act of 1857
Coinage Act of 1873
Coinage Act of 1965

References

1864 in American law
United States federal currency legislation
1864 in American politics
38th United States Congress
1864 in economics